There are a total of 21 Interstate Highways in Ohio, including both primary and auxiliary routes. With the exception of the Ohio Turnpike (which carries portions of Interstate 76 (I-76), I-80, and I-90), all of the Interstate Highways are owned and maintained by the U.S. state of Ohio through the Ohio Department of Transportation (ODOT); however, they were all built with money from the U.S. federal government.

As of 2019, out of all the states, Ohio has the fifth-largest Interstate Highway System. Ohio also has the fifth-largest traffic volume and the third-largest quantity of truck traffic. Ohio ranks second in the nation in terms of the number of bridges for its Interstates.

History 
By 1958, Ohio had spent more money on its Interstate Highways than either New York or California. By the end of 1971, Ohio had only  of Interstate still to build. On September 19, 2003, Ohio finally finished the originally planned Interstate Highway System.

Primary Interstates

Auxiliary Interstates

Business routes

See also

References

External links 

 Ohio Interstate Exit Guide
 Ohio Maps

Interstate